Georgian nationalism is a nationalism which argues for promotion of Georgian national identity and a nation state based on it. 

The beginning of Georgian nationalism can be traced to the middle of the 19th century, when Georgia was part of the Russian Empire. From being more culture-focused in the Imperial Russian and Soviet periods, it went through several phases, evolving into radical ethnocentric in the late 1980s and early in the post-Soviet independence years, and to a more inclusive and civic-oriented form in the mid-2000s. However, vestiges of ethnic nationalism remain among many Georgians.

Emergence 
While the notion of Georgian exceptionalism can be traced back to the middle ages (as demonstrated by the writings of John Zosimus), modern Georgian nationalism emerged in the middle of the 19th century as a reaction to the Russian annexation of fragmented Georgian polities, which terminated their precarious independence, but brought to the Georgians unity under a single authority, relative peace and stability. The first to inspire national revival were aristocratic poets, whose romanticist writings were imbued with patriotic laments. After a series of ill-fated attempts at revolt, especially, after the failed coup plot of 1832, the Georgian elites reconciled with the Russian rule, while their calls for national awakening were rechanneled through cultural efforts. In the 1860s, the new generation of Georgian intellectuals, educated at Russian universities and exposed to European ideas, promoted national culture against assimilation by the Imperial center. Led by the literati such as Ilia Chavchavadze, their program attained more nationalistic colors as the nobility declined and capitalism progressed, further stimulated by the rule of the Russian bureaucracy and economic and demographic dominance of the Armenian middle class in the capital city of Tbilisi. Chavchavadze and his associates called for the unity of all Georgians and put national interests above class and provincial divisions. Their vision did not envisage an outright revolt for independence, but demanded autonomy within the reformed Russian Empire, with greater cultural freedom, promotion of the Georgian language, and support for Georgian educational institutions and the national church, whose independence had been suppressed by the Russian government.

Despite their advocacy of ethnic culture and demographic grievances over Russian and Armenian dominance in Georgia's urban centers, a program of the early Georgian nationalists was inclusive and preferred non-confrontational approach to inter-ethnic issues. Some of them, such as Niko Nikoladze, envisaged the creation of a free, decentralized, and self-governing federation of the Caucasian peoples based on the principle of ethnically proportional representation.

The idea of Caucasian federation within the reformed Russian state was also voiced by the ideologues of Georgian social democracy, who came to dominate Georgian political landscape by the closing years of the 19th century. Initially, the Georgian Social Democrats were opposed to nationalism and viewed it as a rival ideology, but they remained proponents of self-determination. In the words of the historian Stephen F. Jones, "it was socialism in Georgian colors with priority given to the defense of national culture." The Georgian social-democrats were very active in all-Russian socialist movement and after its split in 1905 sided with the Menshevik faction adhering to relatively liberal ideas of their Western European colleagues.

First Georgian republic 

The Bolshevik revolution of 1917 was perceived by the Georgian Mensheviks, led by Noe Zhordania, as a breach of links between Russia and Europe. When they declared Georgia an independent democratic republic on 26 May 1918, they viewed the move as a tragic inevitability against the background of unfolding geopolitical realities.

As the new state faced a series of domestic and international challenges, the internationalist Social-Democratic leadership became more focused on narrower national problems. With this reorientation to a form of nationalism, the Georgian republic became a "nationalist/socialist hybrid." The government's efforts to make education and administration more Georgian drew protests from ethnic minorities, further exacerbated by economic hardship and exploited for their political ends by the Bolsheviks who promoted the export of revolution. The government's response to dissent, including among the ethnic minorities, such as the Abkhaz and Ossetians, was frequently violent and excessive. The decision to resort to military solutions was driven by security concerns rather than readiness to settle ethnic scores. Overall, the Georgian Mensheviks did not turn to authoritarianism and terror. However, the events of that time played an important role in reinforcing stereotypes on all involved sides in the latter-day ethnic conflicts in Georgia.

Soviet Georgia 
After the sovietization of Georgia in 1921, followed by suppression of an armed rebellion against the new regime in 1924, many leading nationalist intellectuals went in exile in Europe. In the Soviet Union, Georgian nationalism went underground or was rechanneled into cultural pursuits, becoming focused on the issues of language, promotion of education, protection of old monuments, literature, film, and sports. Any open manifestation of local nationalism was repressed by the Soviet state, but it did provide cultural frameworks and, as part of its policy of korenizatsiya, helped institutionalize the Georgians as a "titular nationality" in the Georgian Soviet Socialist Republic. Thus, by maintaining the focus of Georgian nationalism on cultural issues, the Soviet regime was able to prevent it from becoming a political movement until the 1980s perestroika period.

The late 1970s saw a re-emergence of Georgian nationalism that clashed with Soviet power. Plans to revise the status of Georgian as the official language of Soviet Georgia were drawn up in the Kremlin in early 1978, but after stiff and unprecedented public resistance the Soviet central government abandoned the plans. At the same time, it also abandoned similar revision plans for the official languages in the Armenian and Azerbaijani SSRs.

Georgian nationalism was eventually more tolerated during the waning years of the USSR due to Mikhail Gorbachev's Glasnost policy. The Soviet government attempted to counter the Georgian independence movement with promises of greater decentralisation from Moscow.

In 1980s, Georgian nationalism became a mass  movement focused on independence. During this time, Georgian nationalism was primarily concerned about demographic decline of ethnic Georgians, threats to Georgia's territorial unity and Soviet affirmative action policies, which were believed to be discriminatory towards Georgians and unjustly beneficial to the ethnic minorities. According to the 1979 Soviet Census, ethnic Georgians made up 68.8% of population in Soviet Georgia. Ethnic Georgians were outnumbered and weakly represented in peripheral districts: Kvemo Kartli, and Samtskhe–Javakheti in the south, in the South Ossetian Autonomous Oblast, and in the Abkhazian ASSR (where Georgians were a plurality), which was a cause of concern. Anti-Georgian riots in Abkhazia and South Ossetia intensified fears that with separation from the Soviet Union, Georgia's ethnic minorities would seek to dismember Georgian territory. The so-called Lykhny Assembly was held on March 18, 1989, when several thousand Abkhaz demanded secession from Georgia. In response, the anti-Soviet nationalist groups organized a series of unsanctioned meetings across Georgia, claiming that the Soviet government was using Abkhaz separatism in order to oppose the Georgia's pro-independence movement. The demonstration in Tbilisi was suppressed by the Soviet Army, which finally diminished Georgians' trust towards the Soviet system and paved the path to the independence.

The re-emergence of Georgian nationalism coincided with the revival of the Georgian Orthodox Church, which returned to its conservative roots, proselytizing Georgian orthodoxy as the national creed. The church showed its solidarity with the national movement, and the most of the parties of the national movement ascribed the church a special national role.

Independent Georgia

Georgian nationalism emerged as a powerful force in the independent Georgia. Zviad Gamsakhurdia, a nationalist dissident, became the first democratically elected President of Georgia in the post-Soviet era. Researcher Stephen F. Jones describes Gamsakhurdia's view of the nation as "romantic, premodern, and transcendent". Gamsakhurdia is quoted saying ""Nationalism" has been turned into a buzzword by socialists, communists, cosmopolitans, degenerate national nihilists. Nationalism is condemned in the world by those amorphous, untraditional, denationalized conglomerates that have no history, no self-contained culture; who want to turn humanity into a homogeneous mass, driven only by beastly instincts and interest in material values". Nationalist parties were also present in the opposition, namely National Democratic Party and National Independence Party. Gia Chanturia included slogan "Georgia for Georgians" in the political program of NDP, a slogan which often featured at the nationalist demonstrations along with other slogans such as "The Soviet Union is the Prison of Nations" and "Long Live a Free, Democratic Georgia".

During the presidency of Eduard Shevardnadze, post-Soviet Georgian nationalism transitioned to the liberal nationalism. President Mikheil Saakashvili often appealed to the civic nationalism. Ethnic nationalism has declined as a political force, despite the fact that ethno-nationalist sentiments are strong among many ethnic Georgians. In 2017, around 2000 people held "Georgian March" on Tbilisi's David Agmashenebeli Avenue, calling authorities to curb Middle Eastern immigration. Georgian March was later transformed into a social movement and a political party.

Georgian nationalist parties and organizations

Defunct
Committee for the Independence of Georgia
Samani (Young Nationalist Fighters for the Prosperity of Georgia)
Tetri Giorgi
Gorgasliani
Round Table—Free Georgia
Union of Georgian Traditionalists
National Independence Party of Georgia
National Democratic Party
People's Front
Ilia Chavchavadze Society
Georgian Legion

Current
Georgian Power
Georgian National Unity
Georgian March (2017–present)

See also
 Georgians in Turkey
 Laz people in Turkey
 Lazistan
 Lazistan Sanjak

Sources

References 
 
  
   
  
  
  
 

 
Nationalism
Modern history of Georgia (country)